Flota Świnoujście is a Polish professional football club based in Świnoujście, West Pomeranian Voivodeship, that competes in the IV liga West.

Flota, as a club, runs three sports sections: soccer, bridge and table tennis. The club also ran a reserve side, which competed in the lower divisions of Polish football, and three junior sides.

History
Flota's football section was founded on 17 April 1957 in Świnoujście as Wojskowy Klub Sportowy Flota (Military Sport Club Flota). In 1968, the club was reorganized and renamed to Międzyzakładowy Klub Sportowy Flota (Inter-works Sport Club Flota). It was then transformed into Miejski Klub Sportowy Flota (Municipal Sport Club Flota). 
Due to mounting financial problems, the club was officially dissolved on 13 May 2015.

Following the club's dissolution, team officials promised the creation of a new team which would begin playing in the lowest level of Polish football, indicating that the earliest return to the first division would be possible in 2023. A new association called Morski Klub Sportowy Flota (Maritime Sport Club Flota) was founded on 19 June 2015.

League history
The club spent the majority of their history in the Polish Third Division. They played in the Polish Second Division for almost 7 years: from the club's promotion in 2007 until being withdrawn after 29 games near the end of the 2014/2015 season.

In 2015, following the founding of the new association, the club joined the klasa A, the 8th tier of Polish association football. The club finished first in the klasa A during the 2015/16 season and went on to win the klasa okręgowa, the 7th tier, the following season. In 2017/18, the team was playing at the 6th tier - in the liga okręgowa.

In the Polish Cup
The club's most notable result at the central level of the Polish Cup was achieved during the 2012/13 season. In the fall of 2012, Flota eliminated Ruch Zdzieszowice (third division at the time) 5–0 in the first round. At the subsequent stage, the team won against top-tier Górnik Zabrze 2–1. The match against Cracovia (second tier) in the eight-finals ended in a 2–2 draw and Flota proceeded to advance to the quarterfinals having won the penalty shootout. In the quarterfinals held in the spring of 2013, Flota was eliminated by Śląsk Wrocław.

Flota also reached the eight-finals of the Polish Cup in 2003.

Honours
 Reached the quarterfinals of the Polish Cup in the 2012/2013 season
 Promotion to Polish First Division in 2007/2008

Former players
Had international caps for their respective countries.
Poland
  Marcin Adamski (1996)
  Arkadiusz Bąk (2008)
  Rafał Grzelak (2013–)
  Robert Kolendowicz (2013–)
  Paweł Skrzypek (2006–2007)
  Michał Stasiak (2013–)
Palestine
  Omar Jarun (2009)

References

External links
 Official club website

 
Świnoujście
Association football clubs established in 1957
1957 establishments in Poland
Football clubs in West Pomeranian Voivodeship
Military association football clubs in Poland